The Prescott National Forest is a 1.25 million-acre (510,000 ha) United States National Forest located in north central Arizona in the vicinity of Prescott. The forest is located in the mountains southwest of Flagstaff and north of Phoenix in Yavapai County, with a small portion (about 3.5 percent) extending into southwestern Coconino County.

The Forest Service divides the forest into 3 administrative districts.  The northern section of the forest is the Chino Valley Ranger District, the southwest section is the Bradshaw Ranger District, and the southeast section is the Verde Ranger District.  Central administrative offices are in Prescott with local ranger district offices in  Camp Verde, Chino Valley, and Prescott.

Wilderness
These are:
 Apache Creek Wilderness (Chino Valley District)
 Castle Creek Wilderness (Bradshaw District)
 Cedar Bench Wilderness (Verde District)
 Granite Mountain Wilderness (Bradshaw District)
 Juniper Mesa Wilderness (Chino Valley District)
 Pine Mountain Wilderness (Verde District) (mostly in Tonto NF)
 Sycamore Canyon Wilderness (Chino Valley District) (partly in Coconino NF and in Kaibab NF)
 Woodchute Wilderness (Verde District)

Campgrounds

The following table(s) display all public campgrounds within the Prescott National Forest.

Dispersed campsites
Dispersed campsites are undeveloped and no facilities such as trash collection, water and toilets are available. Recommended for experienced campers.

Dispersed camping is allowed in wide areas of the Forest except in the Prescott Basin area.  Dispersed campsite locations in that area are listed below.

Family campgrounds
Developed campsites designed to accommodate families of 5-10 (maximum) per site.

* Pricing and Open Season information current as of Monday, 3 December 2007 at 18:27:06 EST; please refer to the official Forest Service website for up-to-date information as it is subject to change.

History
The Prescott Forest Reserve was established by the General Land Office on May 10, 1898. It was transferred to the U.S. Forest Service in 1906 and became a National Forest on March 4, 1907. On July 1, 1908, it absorbed Verde National Forest, and on October 22, 1934, it absorbed Tusayan National Forest.

References

External links
 U.S. Forest Service: Prescott National Forest

 
National Forests of Arizona
Prescott, Arizona
Protected areas of Yavapai County, Arizona
Protected areas of Coconino County, Arizona
Protected areas established in 1908
1908 establishments in Arizona Territory